Wafaa Lamrani (born 1960, in Ksar el-Kebir) is a Moroccan poet. She was featured with two poems, The Wail of Heights and  I am Consecrated to the Coming One in The Poetry of Arab Women: A Contemporary Anthology, and she was one of the five women poets featured in La carte poétique du Maroc.

Sources

Laabi, Abdellatif (editor), La carte poétique du Maroc
Handal, Nathalie (editor), The Poetry of Arab Women: A Contemporary Anthology, Interlink Publishing Group Inc., December 2000 

20th-century Moroccan poets
Living people
1960 births
People from Ksar el-Kebir
Moroccan women writers
21st-century Moroccan poets